The 2015 Kentucky Bank Tennis Championships was a professional tennis tournament played on outdoor hard courts. It was the twentieth (ATP) and eighteenth (ITF) edition of the tournament and part of the 2015 ATP Challenger Tour and 2015 ITF Women's Circuit, offering a total of $50,000 in prize money in both events. It took place in Lexington, United States, on 27 July–2 August 2015.

Singles main draw entrants

Seeds

 1 Rankings are as of July 20, 2015.

Other entrants
The following players received wildcards into the singles main draw:
  Omar Jasika
  Tom Jomby
  Mitchell Krueger
  Eric Quigley

The following player received entry as a special exempt:
  Sekou Bangoura

The following players received entry as an alternate:
  Ryan Sweeting

The following players received entry from the qualifying draw:
  Carsten Ball
  Alex Kuznetsov
  Matija Pecotić
  Noah Rubin

The following players received entry as lucky losers:
  Yasutaka Uchiyama
  Erik Crepaldi

Women's singles main draw entrants

Seeds 

 1 Rankings as of 20 July 2015

Other entrants 
The following players received wildcards into the singles main draw:
  Kristie Ahn
  Catherine Bellis
  Julia Elbaba
  Danielle Lao

The following players received entry from the qualifying draw:
  Nicha Lertpitaksinchai
  Jamie Loeb
  Peangtarn Plipuech
  Chanel Simmonds

Champions

Men's singles

 John Millman def.  Yasutaka Uchiyama, 6–3, 3–6, 6–4

Women's singles

 Nao Hibino def.  Samantha Crawford, 6–2, 6–1

Men's doubles

 Carsten Ball /  Brydan Klein def.  Dean O'Brien /  Ruan Roelofse, 6-4, 7-6(7-4)

Women's doubles

 Nao Hibino /  Emily Webley-Smith def.  Nicha Lertpitaksinchai /  Peangtarn Plipuech, 6–2, 6–2

External links 
 2015 Kentucky Bank Tennis Championships at ITFtennis.com
 Official website 

2015 ATP Challenger Tour
2015 ITF Women's Circuit
2015
Kentucky
2015 in sports in Kentucky